The following is a list of notable events and releases of the year 2016 in Swedish music.

Events

January
 25
 The draw to determine which country will participate in which semi-final of the Eurovision Song Contest 2016 took place in Stockholm City Hall. Sweden is pre-allocated to vote and perform in the first semi-final for scheduling reasons.

February
 6 – Start of the 56th edition of the Melodifestivalen. The next three semi-finals will take place on February 13, 20, and 27.
 15
 The announcement of jazz saxophonist and composer Jonas Kullhammar as the recipient of the 2016 Gullinpriset (awarded in memory of the saxophonist Lars Gullin (1928–1976)).
 26 – A remix of Zara Larsson's hit single "Lush Life", featuring Tinie Tempah, is released, and soon becomes a top 10 hit internationally.

March
 5 – The Melodifestivalen second chance took place on March 5.
 12 – The final of the Melodifestivalen was executed on March 12, 2016.

April
 23 – The Gamlestaden Jazzfestival opened in Gothenburg, Sweden (April 23 – 30).

May
 14
 The final of the Eurovision Song Contest 2016 took place at the Ericsson Globe in Stockholm.
 Sweden finishes as no 9 as the only Scandinavian country to reach the final.

June
 8 – The 24th Sweden Rock Festival started in Norje (June 8 – 11).
 15 – Max Martin was awarded the Polar Music Prize.
 30 – The 4th Bråvalla Festival opened near Norrköping (June 30 - July 2).

July
 10 – Jonas Kullhammar was awarded Gullinpriset at a concert at Sanda Church in memory of late saxophonist Lars Gullin (1928–1976).

August
 12 – Malmöfestivalen opened (August 12 – 19).

September

October
 7 – The 33rd Stockholm Jazz Festival started in Stockholm, Sweden ( October 7–16).

November

December

Album and singles releases

January

February

March

April

May

June

July

August

September

October

November

December

Unknown date
Efter Regnet by Freddie Wadling
Mitt hjärta klappar för dig by Benny Anderssons orkester

Deaths 

 January
 17 – Carina Jaarnek, singer and Dansband artist (cerebral haemorrhage) (born 1962).

 February
 29 – Josefin Nilsson, singer and actress (born 1969).

 May
 1 – Sydney Onayemi, disc jockey (born 1937).
 4 – Olle Ljungström, singer and guitarist (born 1961).
 16 – Fredrik Norén, jazz drummer and band leader (born 1941).

 June
 2 – Freddie Wadling, singer and songwriter (born 1951).

 September
 27 - , singer (born 1936).

November
 12 – Jacques Werup, musician, author, poet, stage artist, and screenwriter (born 1945).

See also
Music of Sweden
Sweden in the Eurovision Song Contest 2016
List of number-one singles and albums in Sweden (see 2016 section on page)

References

 
Swedish music by year
Swedish
Music